The New Adventures of Cinderella (Les Nouvelles Aventures de Cendrillon) is a 2017 French comedy film directed by Lionel Steketee.

Cast
 Marilou Berry as Cinderella / Julie
 Arnaud Ducret as Prince Marco
 Josiane Balasko as Josépha
 Didier Bourdon as The King
 Vincent Desagnat as Prince Gilbert
 Jérôme Commandeur as The Duke
 Josephine Draï as Javotte / Bianca
 Camille Verschuere as Anastasia / Anissa
 Andy Cocq as The Godmother
 Milo Mazé as Alex
 Natoo as Virgin Girl
 Anaïs Delva as Natural Girl
 Gianni Giardinelli as Angry Dwarf

Production 
The filming began at the end of August 2016.

References

External links
 

2017 films
French comedy films
2010s French-language films
2017 comedy films
Films directed by Lionel Steketee
2010s French films